Issack Mabushi (born 17 February 1956) is a Tanzanian boxer. He competed in the men's featherweight event at the 1980 Summer Olympics. At the 1980 Summer Olympics, he lost to Barry McGuigan of Ireland.

References

1956 births
Living people
Tanzanian male boxers
Olympic boxers of Tanzania
Boxers at the 1980 Summer Olympics
Commonwealth Games competitors for Tanzania
Boxers at the 1978 Commonwealth Games
Place of birth missing (living people)
Featherweight boxers